Mustafa Gurugliyevich Yusupov (born July 1, 1995) is a Kyrgyzstani footballer who last played for Dordoi Bishkek in the Kyrgyzstan League and Kyrgyzstan national football team as a defender.

Career

Club
Yusupov was loaned to Ala-Too Naryn for the 2014–15 season. He won the Kyrgyzstan League in 2014 and 2018.

On 29 July 2021, Yusupov was released from his contract by Dordoi Bishkek.

International
Yusupov made his debut for Kyrgyzstan national football team in a friendly match on May 29, 2018 against Azerbaijan. He was included in Kyrgyzstan's squad for the 2019 AFC Asian Cup in the United Arab Emirates.

Career statistics

International

Honours 
Dordoi Bishkek
 Kyrgyz Premier League (3): 2018, 2019, 2020
 Kyrgyzstan Cup (3): 2016, 2017, 2018
 Kyrgyzstan Super Cup (2): 2019, 2021

References

External links

1995 births
Living people
Kyrgyzstan international footballers
Kyrgyzstani footballers
FC Dordoi Bishkek players
Association football defenders
2019 AFC Asian Cup players